Hedda Nova (1899–1981) was a Russian-born American film actress.

Biography
Born in Odessa, Nova received her schooling at a Parisian convent.

Nova appeared in 16 films, mostly westerns, from 1917 through 1926. The Spitfire of Seville (1919) provided her first starring role. In 1926, she was featured in a six-episode series of two-reel jungle films produced by Chesterfield.

Nova was married to Paul Hurst, an actor, director, and screenwriter.

Selected filmography
 The Bar Sinister (1917)
 The Woman in the Web (1918)
 The Changing Woman (1918)
 The Spitfire of Seville (1919)
 Calibre 38 (1919)
 The Turning Point (1920)
 The Mask (1921)
 The Miracle Baby (1923)
 Folly of Youth (1925)
 My Own Pal (1926)

References

External links

1899 births
1981 deaths
Russian film actresses
Russian silent film actresses
Actors from Odesa
Emigrants from the Russian Empire to the United States
Western (genre) film actresses
Film serial actresses